Sorting Nexin 6  also known as SNX6 is a well-conserved membrane-associated protein belonging to the sorting nexin family that is a component of the retromer complex. The protein contains a coiled-coil domain at its C terminus and a PX domain at its N terminus. Binding to PIM1 causes translocation to the nucleus. SNX6 has been shown to associate with TRAF4.

References